Maita is a surname. Notable people with the surname include:

Armando Maita (born 1981), Venezuelan footballer
, Japanese golfer
Luísa Maita (born 1982), Brazilian singer-songwriter

See also
Maita Gomez (1947–2012), Filipino beauty pageant winner and activist

Japanese-language surnames